The Supreme Court of the United States is the highest-ranking judicial body in the United States. Its membership, as set by the Judiciary Act of 1869, consists of the chief justice of the United States and eight associate justices, any six of whom constitute a quorum. Article II, Section 2, Clause 2 of the Constitution grants plenary power to the President of the United States to nominate, and with the advice and consent of the United States Senate, appoint justices to the Supreme Court; justices have life tenure.

Background

The Supreme Court was created by Article III of the United States Constitution, which stipulates that the "judicial power of the United States, shall be vested in one Supreme Court," and was organized by the 1st United States Congress. Through the Judiciary Act of 1789, Congress specified the Court's original and appellate jurisdiction, created thirteen judicial districts, and fixed the number of justices at six (one chief justice and five associate justices).

Since 1789, Congress has occasionally altered the size of the Supreme Court, historically in response to the country's own expansion in size. An 1801 act would have decreased the Court's size to five members upon its next vacancy. However, an 1802 act negated the effects of the 1801 act upon the Court before any such vacancy occurred, maintaining the Court's size at six members. Later legislation increased its size to seven members in 1807, to nine in 1837, and to ten in 1863. An 1866 act was to have reduced the Court's size from ten members to seven upon its next three vacancies, and two vacancies did occur during this period. However, before a third vacancy occurred, the Judiciary Act of 1869 intervened, restoring the Court's size to nine members, where it has remained ever since.

While the justices of the Supreme Court are appointed for life, many have retired or resigned. Beginning in the early 20th century, many justices who left the Court voluntarily did so by retiring from the Court without leaving the federal judiciary altogether. A retired justice, according to the United States Code, is no longer a member of the Supreme Court, but remains eligible to serve by designation as a judge of a U.S. Court of Appeals or District Court, and many retired justices have served in these capacities. Historically, the average length of service on the Court has been less than 15 years. However, since 1970 the average length of service has increased to about 26 years.

List of justices 
Since the Supreme Court was established in 1789, 116 people have served on the Court. The length of service on the Court for the 106 non-incumbent justices ranges from William O. Douglas's  to John Rutledge's  as associate justice and, separated by a period of years off the Court, his  as chief justice. Five individuals, who were confirmed for associate justice, were later appointed chief justice separately: John Rutledge, Edward Douglass White, Charles Evans Hughes, Harlan F. Stone and William Rehnquist. While listed twice, each of them has been assigned only one index number. The justices of the Supreme Court are:

Notes

Timeline of justices
This graphical timeline depicts the progression of the justices on the U.S. Supreme Court. Information regarding each justice's predecessors, successors, and fellow justices, as well as their tenure on the court, can be gleaned (and comparisons between justices drawn) from it. There are no formal names or numbers for the individual seats of the associate justices, which are listed in the table below simply by number. Additionally, the progression of U.S. presidents is shown at the top of the timeline to give a more detailed historical context.

See also 
 Law of the United States
 List of courts of the United States
 List of supreme courts by country

References

External links 
 Biographies of Justices
 Visual Overview of US Supreme Court Justices 1789–2019

 
 
Articles which contain graphical timelines
United States